Camp is a 1965 feature-length underground film directed by Andy Warhol in October 1965 at The Factory. The film stars Gerard Malanga, Baby Jane Holzer, Tally Brown, Mario Montez, Jack Smith, Paul Swan, and Dorothy Dean.

See also
Andy Warhol filmography

References

External links
 
Camp at WarholStars

1965 films
Films directed by Andy Warhol
1960s English-language films
1960s American films